Eritrea is scheduled to compete at the 2024 Summer Olympics in Paris from 26 July to 11 August 2024. It will be the nation's seventh consecutive appearance at the Summer Olympics.

Competitors
The following is the list of number of competitors in the Games.

Athletics

Eritrean track and field athletes achieved the entry standards for Paris 2024, either by passing the direct qualifying mark (or time for track and road races) or by world ranking, in the following events (a maximum of 3 athletes each):

Track and road events

Cycling

Road
Eritrea entered one rider to compete in the men's road race by finishing in the top two at the 2023 African Championships in Accra, Ghana.

References

2024
Nations at the 2024 Summer Olympics
2024 in Eritrean sport